Magnanti may refer to:

 Brooke Magnanti, scientist, blogged as Belle de Jour (writer)
 Thomas L. Magnanti, engineer and academic